Inékar  is a village and cercle of Ménaka Region in southeastern Mali. It has an area of approximately 27,000 square kilometers and in 2009 had a population of 8,714. It was previously a commune in Ménaka Cercle but was promoted to the status of a cercle when Ménaka Region was implemented in 2016.

References

External links
.
.

Populated places in Ménaka Region
Cercles of Mali